The 2014 Ohio Valley Conference women's basketball tournament was held March 5–8 at Nashville Municipal Auditorium in Nashville, Tennessee.   The conference tournament winner will receive the conference's automatic bid to the 2014 NCAA Tournament. The entire tournament will be shown on ESPN3 and the OVC Digital Network.

Format
The tournament is an eight team tournament with the third and fourth seeds receiving a first round bye and the two divisional winners receiving byes through to the semifinals.

The top team in each division, based on conference winning percentage, automatically earns a berth into the OVC Tournament. The next six teams with the highest conference winning percentage also earn a bid, regardless of division. The 1st seed goes to the divisional winner with the higher conference winning percentage, while the No. 2 seed automatically goes to the other divisional winner. The remaining six teams are seeded 3–8 by conference winning percentage, regardless of division.

Seeds

Bracket

See also
2014 Ohio Valley Conference men's basketball tournament

References

External links
2014 OVC Men's & Women's Basketball Championship

Ohio Valley Conference women's basketball tournament
Basketball competitions in Nashville, Tennessee
Women's sports in Tennessee
College sports tournaments in Tennessee
Ohio Valley